The Communauté de communes du Vimeu Vert  is a former communauté de communes in the Somme département and in the Picardie région of France. It was created in December 1993. It was merged into the new Communauté de communes du Vimeu in January 2017.

Composition 
This Communauté de communes included 12 communes:

Acheux-en-Vimeu
Béhen
Cahon
Ercourt
Grébault-Mesnil
Huchenneville
Miannay
Moyenneville
Quesnoy-le-Montant
Saint-Maxent
Tœufles
Tours-en-Vimeu

See also 
Communes of the Somme department

References 

Vimeu Vert